The 4th Illinois Cavalry Regiment was a cavalry regiment that served in the Union Army during the American Civil War.

Service
The 4th Illinois Volunteer Cavalry was mustered into service at Ottawa, Illinois, on September 26, 1861. It was consolidated with 12th Illinois Cavalry Regiment on June 14, 1865.

Total strength and casualties
Regiment lost during service 1 Officer and 31 Enlisted men killed and mortally wounded and 1 Officer and 166 Enlisted men by disease. Total 199. fatalities.

Commanders
 Colonel Theophilus Lyle Dickey - resigned February 16, 1863
 Colonel Martin R. M. Wallace - mustered out November 3, 1864

See also
 List of Illinois Civil War Units
 Illinois in the American Civil War

Notes

References
 "A Horse to Live and a Greyhound to Die: Early Civil War Experiences of Robert and James Thompson" by Bruce Makoto Arnold
 Home of the 4th Illinois Cavalry by: Ronald Roy Wallace
 The Civil War Archive

Units and formations of the Union Army from Illinois
1861 establishments in Illinois
Military units and formations established in 1861
Military units and formations disestablished in 1865